Ember Swift (born in Ontario, Canada) is a Canadian singer, songwriter and guitarist who has released 11 studio albums in both English and Mandarin.

Career

After graduating from the University of Toronto with a degree in East Asian Studies in 1998, Swift and regular band member Lyndell Montgomery (electric violin, and later bass guitar) began touring North America, Australia and after this, New Caledonia. These live shows featured the additional talents of Toronto-based percussionist and drummer Cheryl Reid as of 1998. Later, the duo began working with Michelle Josef and finally, Adam Bowman on drums and percussion. Reid continued to work with Swift and Montgomery until 2008 as a part-time player. She has continued to work directly with Swift from 2008 until the present when Swift returns to North America for tours.

In 2008, Swift and Montgomery went their separate ways and ceased their working relationship. In 2008, she moved to Beijing, where she assembled a new band consisting of Zac Courtney on drums, Paplus Ntahombaye on bass, and Wang Ya Qi 王雅琪 on the traditional Chinese instrument, the erhu.

Swift is also a voice over artist and writer, having published work in magazines and literary quarterlies. Her memoir is scheduled to be released in 2022 and she appeared as a vocalist on the video game Mobile Legends.

In 2021, Swift released her most recent album entitled Mid-March Meltdown, partially co-written with Beijing-based band member Gabriel Beaudoin and mixed with co-producer Tim Abraham. Three music videos were released for the tracks "I Don't Love You," "Broken Thing," and "Cricket Heart."

Personal life
Swift married Chinese musician Guo Jian (国囝), and gave birth to a daughter (Jan 2012) and a son (Dec 2013). She separated from Guo Jian in 2015 and was formally divorced in 2018. Swift continues to live in Beijing, China where she co-raises her two children.

Discography

Studio Albums 
 Self-Titled (1996)
 InsectInside (1997)
 Can't Corner Me (1998)
 Permanent Marker (1999)
 Stiltwalking (2002)
 Disarming (2004)
 The Dirty Pulse (2006)
 Lentic: The New Project (2009)
 11:11 (2011)
 Sticks & Stones (2017)
 Mid-March Meltdown (2021)

Live Albums 
 The Wage Is the Stage (live) (2000)
 Snapshots (live EP) (2000)
 Witness: Live in Australia (2005; DVD)

Awards 
 2006: "Youth Role Model of the Year" – Jer's Version Foundation
 2006: Best Band Website – Canadian Independent Music Award

References

External links
 Ember Swift

1970s births
Living people
Canadian women singer-songwriters
Canadian folk guitarists
Canadian women folk guitarists
Canadian folk singer-songwriters
Musicians from Toronto
21st-century Canadian women singers
21st-century Canadian guitarists
University of Toronto alumni
21st-century women guitarists